

Types of volcanoes 

 

There are multiple types of volcanoes in Mexico. Volcanoes can be of different types such as cinder cone volcanoes, composite volcanoes, shield volcanoes, and lava domes. Each of these variations of volcanos forms in its own way. Cinder cone volcanoes are the simplest type of volcano. This volcano forms from particles of solidified lava that ejected from a single vent. When the lava is eruptive and blows into the air, it separates into small fragments that solidify and fall around the central vent to form an oval cone at the top of the volcano. “Composite volcanoes or stratovolcanoes, make up some of the world’s most memorable mountains: Mount Rainier, Mount Fuji, and Mount Cotopaxi.” These volcanoes are very steep sided and symmetrical, in a cone shape. They have a conduit system which allows the magma to flow from deep within the Earth’s surface. They have many vents within the volcano which allows the lava to break through the walls, which allows for the volcano to grow up to thousands of meters tall. Composite volcanoes are also known to explode violently, such as Mount Saint Helens. Another type of volcano, known as shield volcanoes, are very large and look like shields from above. The lava from within shield volcanoes is very thin, so when it pours out in all directions from the central summit vent, it travels for long distances. These volcanoes filled up slowly over time, with eruptions creating layers on top of layers. Unlike shield volcanoes, lava dome volcanoes are created by small masses of lava that are too thick to flow very far down the slope. They commonly occur within the creators of large composite volcanoes. The dome grows from lava expanding within the volcano. When lava domes explode, they violently release huge amounts of ash and rock.

Trans-Mexican Volcanic Belt 
The Trans-Mexican Volcanic Belt is the Neogene volcanic arc that takes place on the southern edge of the North American plate. It is approximately 1000 kilometers long.  It overlies the Rivera and Cocos slabs. It’s a unique volcanic belt, as it is not parallel to the Middle American trench, where most of the stratovolcanoes are usually positioned. It has a wide range of chemical compositions. Such as intraplate. It consists of many volcanic features that include monogenetic volcano cones, shield volcanoes, lava dome, complexes, and major calderas. Fun fact: It actually snows all year long on some of the highest peaks are people living, and when the weather is clear, they can be seen by those who live in Mexico on some of the high parts from which these volcanoes rise. Before the Trans-Mexican Belt took over, the Sierra Madre Occidental actually was in that exact area. This is how the Trans-Mexican Volcanic belt evolved and changed and the Rivera plate begin to subduction beneath Central Mexico in the early to late Miocene. 2) The slab tear begins to propagate west to east across the back northern area of the belt, which allowed asthenospheric heat in to generate the Mafic episode.3) The latest Miocene was the onset of more silic volcanics generated by flat slab subduction which pushed the belt further to the north.4) Lastly, The late Pliocene to Holocene is characterized by slab rollback sending the volcanic arc trenchward to the present day position.

List
This is a list of active and extinct volcanoes in Mexico.

Volcanic hazards 
A volcanic hazard is a process that can cause damage to anything or anyone. Tephra/ash is a hazard caused by many volcanoes. Ash covers items like buildings, vehicles, homes, etc., and if "animals or humans consume fine-grained ash, it can cause health problems.." Lahars are a kind of flowing volcanic hazard that can be harmful as they can take/drag anything in their way. Lahars can flow at varying speeds, making it difficult for people to escape from them. Pyroclastic flows, which are toxic gases created by hot clouds that can destroy all things they come into contact with, are another example of a volcanic hazard. Lava flows are the least deadly out of the volcanic hazards as "most move slowly enough that people can move out the way easily." However, objects, people, and more that go near the lava flows "will be knocked over, surrounded, buried, or ignited by the extremely hot temperature of lava."

Ring of Fire 
A lot of earthquakes and volcanoes are in the pacific ring of fire. In addition, the ring of fire is “a direct result of plate tectonics, and the movement and collisions of lithospheric plates" and Mexico’s volcanoes are part of this ring of fire. A specific Mexican volcano apart from the ring of fire is Popocatépetl, which is also one of the most dangerous volcanoes. This volcano lies “on the Trans-Mexican Volcanic Belt, which is the result of the small Cocos Plate sub-ducting beneath the North American Plate”. The Popocatépetl volcano is a danger to a lot of  people, so they have to be careful when or if this volcano erupts. In general, Mexico’s volcanoes are in the ring of fire, therefore people who live near the volcanoes listed above have to be careful with the volcanoes that will most likely erupt again.

Effects of volcanic eruptions on surrounding communities 
When a volcano erupts, the communities around them are affected depending on how big of an eruption occurred. Popocatépetl is an excellent example of the effects that volcanoes can have on a community. Popocatépetl is a famous volcano due to it being inactive for 50 years and coming back to life in 1994. Since 1994, it has been producing powerful explosions at irregular intervals. In 2013, It released a cloud of ash that would spread for 2 miles high over a period of several days of eruptions. In the city of San Pedro Nexapa, about 9.5 from the Popocatépetl, local residents were able to find small piles of ash on parts of the sidewalk. It is easy for ash to get picked up by the wind, and get passed around contaminating the air. Cars driving by pick up the ash with their exhaust, and with the volcano still erupting irregularly, ash is periodically flowing out. Following the explosions, a total of 17 flights were canceled  “due to climate conditions and in accordance with their own international policies.” Other effects that volcanoes can have on communities in close proximity with the base are more in danger for ash clouds, mud flow, gases, earthquakes, and tsunamis. “During volcanic eruptions and their immediate aftermath, increased respiratory system morbidity has been observed as well as mortality among those affected by volcanic eruptions.”

Impact on tree growth 
Environmental effects on growth and survival of trees in Mexico from volcanic activity are significant. Using evidence from the effects of the 1855 - 1856 eruption of that Tacaná volcano and ash fall from the 1902 eruption of the Santa Maria volcano and the radial growth of trees at Tacaná. Because of these incidents, they caused two significant suppression events to happen. The first event took place from 1857 to 1868 which caused by the historic eruption of Tacaná, two years prior. A year later after the eruption of the Santa Maria volcano, the second suppression event started from 1903 to 1908, during which tree growth was affected by the thickness of ash fall from the eruption and deposited near each tree. Another example that the impact of volcano eruption‘s on forest ecosystems can be the 1913 Plinian eruption of Volćan de Fuego, 7.7 km to the south. This event was one of the largest explosive eruption‘s in Mexico and produced ash flow deposits up to 40 m thick. Also, this indicated extremely low growth in 1913 and 1914, radio growth reduction was over 30% in 75% of the sampled trees.

See also
 Central America Volcanic Arc
 Trans-Mexican Volcanic Belt
 List of volcanoes in Guatemala
 List of volcanoes in the United States

References 

 Teodoro Carlón Allende, José Luis Macías, Manuel E. Mendoza, and José Villanueva Díaz. Evidence of volcanic activity in the growth rings of trees at the Tacaná volcano, Mexico–Guatemala border. Canadian Journal of Forest Research. 50(1): 65-72. https://doi.org/10.1139/cjfr-2019-0214    

Volcanism of Mexico
Mexico

Volcanoes
Volcanoes